Queinnectrechus is a genus of beetles in the family Carabidae, containing the following species:

 Queinnectrechus angusticollis Belousov & Kabak, 2003
 Queinnectrechus brevis Belousov & Kabak, 2003
 Queinnectrechus excentricus Deuve, 1992
 Queinnectrechus glacialis Ueno, 1998
 Queinnectrechus globipennis Ueno, 1998
 Queinnectrechus guttula Belousov & Kabak, 2003
 Queinnectrechus humeralis Belousov & Kabak, 2003
 Queinnectrechus incisus Belousov & Kabak, 2003
 Queinnectrechus janatai Belousov & Kabak, 2003
 Queinnectrechus micrangulus Belousov & Kabak, 2003
 Queinnectrechus miroslavi Belousov & Kabak, 2003
 Queinnectrechus smetanai Ueno, 1995
 Queinnectrechus zheduoshanus Ueno, 1998

References

Trechinae